Mariia Sergeevna Tkacheva ( born 17 December 2001) is a Russian tennis player.

Tkacheva has career-high rankings by the WTA of 331 singles and 362 in doubles, both achieved October and November 2022, respectively. She has won four singles titles and seven doubles titles on the ITF Women's World Tennis Tour.

Tkacheva won her biggest title to date at the 2022 President's Cup, where she partnered Anastasia Zolotareva to win the doubles tournament.

ITF Circuit finals

Singles: 7 (4 titles, 3 runner-ups)

Doubles: 10 (7 titles, 3 runner-ups)

References

External links
 
 

2001 births
Living people
Russian female tennis players
21st-century Russian women